is a monthly Japanese josei manga magazine published by Kodansha, with a circulation reported at 81,870 in 2015. The magazine is headquartered in Tokyo.

History and profile
Kiss was first published in 1992 as a supplementary monthly magazine to the shōjo magazine Mimi. When Mimi was discontinued in 1996, the editorial team of Mimi, most of them young women in their 20s, switched to being in charge of Kiss, which is why it is considered a successor to Mimi. Also some of its artists of Mimi worked for KIss after its closure. Later switched to a bimonthly release until early 2013 when it switched back to a monthly publication.

Serializations

Current
  by Risa Itō (2018)
  by Natsumi Shiba (2018)

Past

1990s
  by Risa Ito (1998–2018)

2000s
  by Tomoko Ninomiya (2001–2010)
  by Toriko Chiya (2005–2015)
  by Yayoi Ogawa (2006–2011)
  by Keikei (2007–2012)
  by Waki Yamato (2007–2009)
  by Aya Tsuge (2008–2016)
  by Naoko Matsuda (2008–2010)
  by Akiko Higashimura (2008–2017)
  by Banko Kuze (2009–2021)
  by Junko Karube (2009–2010)
  by Naoko Kusaka (2009–2010)
  by Tsunami Umino (2009–2011)

2010s
 SatoShio by Seiko Erisawa (2010–2011)
  by Keikei (2011–2012)
  by 	Tsunami Umino (2012–2020)
  by Takumi Ishida (2013–2020)
  by Rie Aruga (2014–2021)
  by Akiko Higashimura (2014–2017)

2020s
  by Nico Nicholson (2021–2023)

References

External links
  

1992 establishments in Japan
Monthly manga magazines published in Japan
Semimonthly manga magazines published in Japan
Josei manga magazines
Kodansha magazines
Magazines established in 1992
Magazines published in Tokyo